Andrew Roach (born August 23, 1973) is an American former professional ice hockey defenseman who predominantly played in the Deutsche Eishockey Liga (DEL).

Playing career
A stand out at Ferris State University, Roach has played for several teams after his outstanding college career including stints in the  IHL, NLA, AHL, and currently plays in the DEL.  Roach made his NHL debut with the St. Louis Blues in the 2005–06 season, registering 6 penalty minutes against the Detroit Red Wings in their home opener at Joe Louis Arena.

Roach played in just 5 games with the Blues before he was reassigned to AHL affiliate, the Peoria Rivermen, and subsequently returned to Europe with the ZSC Lions. The following season, Roach returned to the DEL and signed with Eisbären Berlin.

After four seasons with Eisbären Berlin, Roach then signed a one-year contract with rival DEL team, DEG Metro Stars on August 18, 2010.

Career statistics

Regular season and playoffs

International

Awards and honors

References

External links

1973 births
Living people
Adler Mannheim players
American men's ice hockey defensemen
DEG Metro Stars players
Eisbären Berlin players
Ferris State Bulldogs men's ice hockey players
Ice hockey players from Michigan
Krefeld Pinguine players
Long Beach Ice Dogs (IHL) players
People from Mattawan, Michigan
Peoria Rivermen (AHL) players
St. Louis Blues players
San Antonio Dragons players
Undrafted National Hockey League players
Utah Grizzlies (IHL) players
Waterloo Black Hawks players
ZSC Lions players
AHCA Division I men's ice hockey All-Americans